Double Negative is the twelfth studio album by Low, released on September 14, 2018. It is the last album to feature bass guitarist Steve Garrington, who would go on to leave the band in 2020.

Critical reception

On Metacritic, which assigns a normalized rating out of 100 to reviews from mainstream publications, Double Negative has an average score of 86 based on 21 reviews, indicating "universal acclaim". Writing in Pitchforks list of the best albums of 2018, Marc Hogan said that "static prevails and flickering tones are almost untraceable to the instruments that made them," and that this sound "captured [2018's] pervasive dread like nothing else."

Accolades

Track listing

Personnel
Low
 Steve Garrington – bass guitar
 Mimi Parker – vocals, percussion
 Alan Sparhawk – guitar, vocals

Additional musicians
 Maaika van der Linde – bass flute on "Always Up"

Technical
 Brett Bullion – assistant engineering
 B. J. Burton – recording, mixing, mastering
 Zach Hanson – assistant engineering

Artwork
 David Kramer – editing assistance, design
 Peter Liversidge – artwork, photos

Charts

References

2018 albums
Low (band) albums
Sub Pop albums
Albums produced by BJ Burton
Ambient albums by American artists
Noise rock albums by American artists
Electronic albums by American artists
Experimental rock albums by American artists
Post-rock albums by American artists